Tšoanelo Koetle (born 22 November 1992) is Mosotho international footballer who plays for Lioli as a right-back. He played at the 2014 FIFA World Cup qualification.

Career statistics

Scores and results list Lesotho's goal tally first.

References

External links
 

1992 births
Living people
Lesotho footballers
Lesotho international footballers
Association football midfielders
Lioli FC players
Matlama FC players